Line 7 of Suzhou Rail Transit is an under construction rapid transit line in Suzhou. Construction started on December 25, 2019.  The line will be 29.6 kilometers long.

According to the plans, the part of Line 4 between Hongzhuang and Muli stations will be operated as Line 7.

It has Tian'edang Parking area in the line.

Stations

References

Suzhou Rail Transit lines